HECT, C2 and WW domain containing E3 ubiquitin protein ligase 2 is a protein that in humans is encoded by the HECW2 gene.

Model organisms 

Model organisms have been used in the study of HECW2 function. A conditional knockout mouse line called Hecw2tm1a(EUCOMM)Wtsi was generated at the Wellcome Trust Sanger Institute. Male and female animals underwent a standardized phenotypic screen to determine the effects of deletion. Additional screens performed:  - In-depth immunological phenotyping

Clinical significance 
Mutations in the HECW2 gene have been associated to epilepsy and intellectual disability. These mutations affect one copy of the HECW2 gene and are believed to change the function of the HECW2 protein.

References

Further reading